The Vai are a Mande-speaking ethnic group that live mostly in Liberia, with a small minority living in south-eastern Sierra Leone. The Vai are known for their indigenous syllabic writing system known as Vai syllabary, developed in the 1820s by Momolu Duwalu Bukele and other Vai elders. Over the course of the 19th century, literacy in the writing system became widespread. Its use declined over the 20th century, but modern computer technology may enable a revival.

The Vai people speak the Vai language, which is of the Mande languages. The Sierra Leonean Vai are predominantly found in Pujehun District (around the Liberian border). Many Sierra Leonean villages that border Liberia are populated by the Vai. In total only about 1200 Vai live in Sierra Leone.

History
The earliest written documentation of the Vai is by Dutch merchants sometime in the first half of the 17th century, denoting a political group near Cape Mount. The Vai likely settled there as part of the Mane invasions from the Mali Empire in the middle of the 16th century and, according to Vai oral tradition, were led by the brothers Fábule and Kīatámba in conquering the land down to the coast.

Culture and education
In many aspects, the Vai are a unique African ethnicity. Many believe that the region inhabited by the Vai is the original home of the Poro, a male secret society known throughout West Africa. The Vai are also quite musical. They play many instruments and perform dances on special occasions.

The Vai have three types of schooling. The first and most important is the bush school, where the children learn traditional Vai socialization skills, important survival skills, and other traits of village life for four to five years. Second is the English school; some Vai children attend English schools to learn the English language. Finally, there are the Quranic schools, where Vai children are taught the Arabic language under the guidance of the local Muslim religious leader.

Religion and spiritual belief
The Vai are predominantly Muslim, and have for centuries practiced traditions rooted in studying the Quran, with a minority being Christian.

These monotheistic religions however coexist with traditional beliefs in the supernatural, and shamanistic practices are common as people consider themselves to be surrounded by spirits that can change into living creatures or objects. These spirits are believed to have the power to do evil to individuals or to the whole tribe. The Vai perform ceremonies for the dead in which they leave articles of clothing and food near the graves of the deceased.

Economy
Most Vai make their living by farming the fertile land. Rice is their staple crop and can be cultivated with other vegetables on upland plots of cleared land. In addition to rice, crops such as cotton, corn, pumpkins, bananas, ginger, coffee, and cocoa are raised. The Vai also gather various nuts and berries from the forests. The palm tree is an important commodity to the Vai. Nuts, butter, wine, fuel, soap, and baskets are among its many derivatives.

Notable Vai people

 Momolu Duwalu Bukele (1788–1888), inventor of the Vai script in the early 19th century
 Momulu Massaquoi (1870–1938), Liberian politician and diplomat
 Nathaniel Varney Massaquoi (1905–1962), Liberian educator and politician
 Fatima Massaquoi (1912–1978), pioneering educator in Liberia, author of The Autobiography of an African Princess
 Hans-Jürgen Massaquoi (1926–2013), of mixed Liberian Vai and German descent, grew up as a non-Aryan in Nazi Germany to later become a journalist in the USA.
 Ruth Perry (born 1939), former President of Liberia
 Varney Sherman (born 1953), Liberian politician
 Dr. Eugene H. Shannon (born 1946), Liberian geologist, environmentalist, former Minister of Lands, Mines and Energy
 Wayétu Moore (born 1985), Liberian author, of mixed Vai and Americo-Liberian ancestry
 Joseph Fahnbulleh (born 2001), American-born Liberian sprinter
 Haji Wright

See also
 Vai language
 Vai syllabary

References

Ethnic groups in Liberia
Ethnic groups in Sierra Leone
Female genital mutilation
Female genital mutilation by country
Mandé people
Muslim communities in Africa